Norton Zone was a cloud file sharing and online backup tool service operated by Symantec that can be used to share, sync, access, store, and backup data. It also allows for file collaboration with commenting. Norton Zone is accessible through apps for Windows, Windows RT,  Android, Mac, and iOS platforms. Norton Zone uses encrypted and replicated cloud storage and provides client-side encryption.

As a leading AntiVirus provider via its Norton AntiVirus software, Symantec distinguishes  Norton Zone from competition by automatically scanning files for malware and viruses.

Norton Zone offered 5 GB of storage for free and larger storage allocations via subscription.

On June 3, 2014, Symantec announced that Norton Zone would be discontinued on August 6, 2014.

References

Cloud applications
Data synchronization
File hosting
File sharing services
Email attachment replacements
Online backup services
Cross-platform software
Cloud storage
File hosting for macOS
File hosting for Windows